Della Patricia Pascoe (née James; born 28 March 1949) is a retired British international sprinter. She competed in the women's 100 metres at the 1968 Summer Olympics.

She also represented England in the 100 metres and 200 metres, at the 1970 British Commonwealth Games in Edinburgh, Scotland.

She is married to a former hurdler, Alan Pascoe.

References

External links
 

1949 births
Living people
Athletes (track and field) at the 1968 Summer Olympics
Athletes (track and field) at the 1972 Summer Olympics
British female sprinters
Olympic athletes of Great Britain
Sportspeople from Portsmouth
Athletes (track and field) at the 1970 British Commonwealth Games
Commonwealth Games competitors for England
Olympic female sprinters
20th-century British women